Matthew Neil William Spriegel (born 4 March 1987) is an English former cricketer who played as a left-handed batsman and right-arm off break bowler for Loughborough UCCE, Surrey and Northamptonshire.

Early life
Spriegel was born on 4 March 1987 in Epsom, Surrey. He was educated at Whitgift School before attending Loughborough University.

Domestic career
Spriegel made his first-class debut for Loughborough UCCE against Somerset on 14 April 2007. He played six first-class matches for them, three in 2007 and three in 2008, all of them as captain.

He first played for Surrey in a 50-over Friends Provident Trophy fixture against Essex at Chelmsford on 25 May 2008. He made his Surrey first-class debut in a County Championship game against Somerset at Whitgift School on 30 May 2008. He made his maiden first-class hundred in the final match of the 2009 season against Glamorgan at The Oval.

On 7 September 2012, it was confirmed that Northamptonshire had signed Spriegel on a two-year contract. Following his release by Northamptonshire at the end of his contract, Spriegel announced his retirement on 13 November 2014.

References

External links

1987 births
Living people
Alumni of Loughborough University
Cricketers from Epsom
English cricketers of the 21st century
English cricketers
Loughborough MCCU cricketers
Northamptonshire cricketers
People educated at Whitgift School
Surrey cricketers